Santos Football Club or simply Santos, also officially known under their sponsored title as Engen Santos, is a South African professional soccer club based in the Lansdowne, a suburb of the city of Cape Town. It plays in the SAFA Second Division.

History
The club was established in Heideveld on the Cape Flats in 1982 and was originally known as Lightbodys Santos FC, after its sponsor. During apartheid, it was renowned for the insistence on non-racial inclusivity, hence its nickname "The People's Team".

They played in the Federation Professional League (FPL), the only truly non-racial football body in the country from 1982 to 1990. They won the championship in 1983/4/6/7/8/90 before joining the National Soccer League.

The NSL became the PSL in 1996, with Santos earning promotion to the new league for the 1997–98 season. Santos tasted their first success in the new format of the league in 2001–02 when they surprisingly won the title under the mentorship of Gordon Igesund. This side featured players like Edries Burton, Andre Arendse, Musa Otieno and the club's all-time top goalscorer Jean-Marc Ithier. With the title win Santos became the first – and to date the only – team that was not a founder-member of the PSL to win the league.

They were also crowned Bob Save Super Bowl winners in 2001 and BP Top 8 winners in 2002.

Santos were relegated from the PSL at the end of the 2011–12 season for the first time in the club's history. After finishing 15th in the league they entered the 2011–12 PSL Playoff Tournament where they were pitted against Chippa United and Thanda Royal Zulu. Heading into their final playoff game Santos needed a win over Chippa United to maintain their PSL status but they were defeated 4–3 and subsequently relegated, with Chippa United taking their place in the PSL.

Santos were relegated from the National First Division at the end of the 2016–17 season. The club now plays in the Western Cape ABC Motsepe League.

Notable former coaches
  David Bright (2008–09)
  Roald Poulsen (2004)
  Jean-Marc Ithier (2007–08)
  Mart Nooij (2012)
  Clive Barker (2000–01, 2005)
  Gordon Igesund (2001–02)
  Roger De Sa (2005–07)
  Boebie Solomons (2003–04, 2009–11)
  Muhsin Ertugral (2003)

Honours
PSL Champions: 2001–02
ABSA Cup Winners: 2003
FPL League Champions: 1983, 84, 86, 87, 88, 90
FPL Cup Winners: 1985, 88, 90
Challenge Cup Winners–: 1988
Bob Save Super Bowl Winners: 2001
BP Top 8 Winners: 2002

Imange Pikoko was the first black captain in the teams history

International

 IFA Shield (IFA): 2008: Runners-up

Club records
Most starts:  Edries Burton 409
Most goals:  Jean-Marc Ithier 70
Most capped player:  Musa Otieno
Most starts in a season:  Cassiem Mohamed 44 (1993)
Most goals in a season:  Duncan Crowie 19 (1991)
Record victory: 6–0 v Intercity Aces (6/3/99, Bob Save Super Bowl); vs Beau West City (26 February 2005, Absa Cup); vs Cemforce FC (12/3/05, Absa Cup); vs Island FC (11/3/06, Absa Cup)
Record defeat: 1–7 v Mamelodi Sundowns (19 August 1998, PSL)

Premier Soccer League record
2011/2012 – 15th (relegated)
2010/2011 – 8th
2009/2010 – 4th
2008/2009 – 10th
2007/2008 – 3rd
2006/2007 – 10th
2005/2006 – 8th
2004/2005 – 12th
2003/2004 – 6th
2002/2003 – 9th
2001/2002 – 1st
2000/2001 – 5th
1999/2000 – 11th
1998/1999 – 16th
1997/1998 – 16th

Club officials/Technical team
Chairman:  Goolam Allie
Coach:  Tony De Nobrega
Assistant coach:  Kamaal Sait 
Marketing & Media Officer:  Illhaam Dramat 
Goalkeeper coach:  Nigel Dixon

Shirt sponsor & kit manufacturer 
 Shirt sponsor: Goolam Sports
 Kit manufacturer: Winner

Notes

References

External links 
 

 
Association football clubs established in 1982
Premier Soccer League clubs
Soccer clubs in Cape Town
National First Division clubs
1982 establishments in South Africa